
The Ministries Trial (or, officially, the United States of America vs. Ernst von Weizsäcker, et al.) was the eleventh of the twelve trials for war crimes the U.S. authorities held in their occupation zone in Germany in Nuremberg after the end of World War II. These twelve trials were all held before U.S. military courts, not before the International Military Tribunal, but took place in the same rooms at the Palace of Justice. The twelve U.S. trials are collectively known as the "Subsequent Nuremberg Trials" or, more formally, as the "Trials of War Criminals before the Nuremberg Military Tribunals" (NMT).

This case is also known as the Wilhelmstrasse Trial, so-named because both the Reich Chancellery and the German Foreign Office were located at the Wilhelmstrasse, a street in Berlin that was often used as a metonym for overall German governmental administration. The defendants in this case were officials of various Reich ministries, facing various charges for their roles in Nazi Germany and thus their participation in or responsibility for the numerous atrocities committed both in Germany and in occupied countries during the war.

The judges in this case, heard before Military Tribunal VI, were William C. Christianson (presiding judge) from Minnesota, Robert F. Maguire from Oregon and Leon W. Powers from Iowa. The Chief of Counsel for the Prosecution was Telford Taylor; the chief prosecutor was Robert Kempner. The indictment was filed on 15 November 1947; the hearings lasted from 6 January 1948 until 18 November that year. Five months later, on 11 April 1949, the judges presented their 833-page judgment. Sentences were handed down on 13 April 1949. Of all the twelve trials, this was the one that lasted longest and ended last. Of the 21 defendants arraigned, two were acquitted, and 18 others were found guilty on at least one count of their indictments and received prison sentences ranging from three years to 25 years. In addition, one defendant, Ernst Wilhelm Bohle, pleaded guilty, becoming the only defendant to do so in the Subsequent Nuremberg Trials.

Indictment

The defendants were indicted on seven counts:

Count 1: Crime against peace

Count 2: Taking part in a common plan or conspiracy to commit the aforementioned crimes (later dropped by the NMT in all trials)

Count 3: War crimes

Count 4: Crimes against humanity

Count 5: War crimes and crimes against humanity through the plundering and spoliation of the Occupied Territories

Count 6: War crimes and crimes against humanity through the enslavement and deportation of concentration camp prisoners and civilians in the occupied countries for slave labor.

Count 7: Membership in a criminal organization, the NSDAP and the SS.

Defendants 

 Stuckart was tried again in 1950 before a denazification court and sentenced as a Mitläufer (follower) a fine of DM 50,000.

Herbert Backe, the former minister for agriculture who should also have been tried, committed suicide on 6 April 1947 while in custody awaiting the trial.

References 

Description from the U.S. Holocaust Memorial Museum.
Another description
Transcript of a German radio broadcast from 1999 (in German).

United States Nuremberg Military Tribunals
1947 in Germany
1948 in Germany
Incitement to genocide case law